The Great Moment may refer to:

The Great Moment (1921 film), an American silent drama film
The Great Moment (1944 film), an American biographical film